Scutigerina weberi is a species of centipedes in the family Scutigeridae. It is distributed throughout Madagascar,  Mozambique, Namibia, Zambia, Zimbabwe, Papua New Guinea, Sri Lanka, and New Caledonia.

References

Silvestri F. (1904). Contribuzione alla conoscenza dei chilopodi. I. Nuovi generi di Scutigeridae. II. Nuove specie di Paralamyctes - Redia, I: 253-258, see p. 254.
Edgecombe G.D., Giribet G. (2004). Adding mitochondrial sequence data (16S rRNA and cytochrome c oxidase subunit I) to the phylogeny of centipedes (Myriapoda: Chilopoda): an analysis of morphology and four molecular loci - Journal of Zoological Systematics and Evolutionary Research, 42 (2):89-134, see p. 132.

External links
Peristomatic structures in Scutigeromorpha (Chilopoda): A comparative study, with new characters for higher-level systematics

Scutigeromorpha
Animals described in 1903